The Soloviev D-25V is a Soviet gas-turbine turboshaft engine for use in large helicopters. Designed and originally manufactured by the Soloviev Design Bureau the engine has been in production since May 1960. The power unit consists of two engines coupled to a gearbox weighing 3,200 kg (7,050 lb).

The V in the designation means vertoletny, for helicopters.

Variants 
D-25VStandard helicopter use production engines
D-25VFAdditional compressor zero-stage, power output 
D-25VKA combined propeller and shaft output engine for the Kamov Ka-22 developing

Applications 
 Mi-6 helicopter
 Mi-10 helicopter
 Mi-10K "flying crane" helicopter
 Mi-12 helicopter
 Kamov Ka-22 compound helicopter
 Yakovlev Yak-60 heavy lift helicopter (concept cancelled during design stage)

Specifications (D-25V)

See also

References

Further reading

External links 

 D-25V description and photos at the manufacturer's site

D-25
1950s turboshaft engines